Mont Sokbaro (also spelled as Sagbarao) is a hill that is mostly cited as the highest point of Benin, with an elevation of .

Mont Sokbaro is located on the border of the Donga Department in Benin and the Kara Region in the country of Togo, close to the source of the Mono River. The hill is part of the quartzite massif of the Atakora Mountains that continues westward into the latter country, where they are called the Togo Mountains. Some of these have higher elevations. Close by lie the villages of Tchèmbèré, Aledjo-Koura and Akaradè. Hiking activities occur to the top of the hill, but the area is in need more touristic development.

See also
 Geography of Benin
 Geography of Togo

External links
  Mont Sokbaro, Togo, Geonames.org

References

Sokbaro
Sokbaro
Benin–Togo border
Highest points of countries